This discography relates to releases by Savatage only. See Trans-Siberian Orchestra, Jon Oliva's Pain, Circle II Circle, Chris Caffery and Doctor Butcher for other related works.

The discography of Savatage, an American heavy metal band, consists of eleven studio albums, two live albums, five compilation albums, two video albums, three EPs, nine music videos, and nineteen singles.

Albums

Studio albums

EPs

Live albums

Compilations

Videos

Video albums

Music videos

Singles

References

Discographies of American artists
Heavy metal group discographies
Rock music group discographies